Systema is a Russian martial art. There are multiple schools of systems that began appearing after the end of the Soviet Union in the 1990s, with teachers claiming their respective "systems" (usually named after themselves). Training includes, but is not limited to: hand-to-hand combat, grappling, knife fighting, and firearms training. Training involves drills and sparring without set kata.

Mass media and popular culture appearances
The issue has gathered interest as its coverage has increased. Examples include CTV Travel's show Go Warrior in 2008 and Black Belt magazine in 2011. Starting in 2013, the FX cable series The Americans, a series about two Russians undercover agents as an American husband and wife couple during the Cold War in the 1980s, use the techniques of systema in the fight choreography for the show. For the 2018 BBC crime drama McMafia, actor James Norton learned aspects of systema with David Kirillov, who runs the London School of Systema, in preparation for his leading role as a London banker drawn into the violent world of the Russian mafia. Systema has also been used by Lamarr Houston of the Chicago Bears in his training. In Japanese fighting games like Street Fighter V by Capcom, character Kolin has a systema fighting style, as well as Koei Tecmo's Dead or Alive 6 with Marie Rose. Systema was used as the basis for the fighting style of the Black Widow trained assassins in the 2021 Marvel Cinematic Universe film Black Widow starring Scarlett Johansson.

References

 Russian martial arts